The battle or siege of Malacca may refer to several historical battles that occurred in present-day Malacca, Malaysia:

 Capture of Malacca (1511), the Portuguese conquest of the Malacca Sultanate
 Siege of Malacca (1568), Portugal repels an Acehnese siege
 Siege of Malacca (1606), Portugal repels Dutch and Johor forces
 Battle of Malacca (1641), the Dutch conquest of Portuguese Malacca
Battle of the Malacca Strait (1945), the Royal Navy hunt down a Japanese cruiser